Mutluca is a village in the Solhan District, Bingöl Province, Turkey. The village is populated by Kurds of the Çarekan tribe and had a population of 191 in 2021.

The hamlets of Beşevler, Gözübüyük and Yayıklı are attached to the village.

References 

Villages in Solhan District
Kurdish settlements in Bingöl Province